The Delhi state assembly elections 2008, which were held on 29 November 2008 for Legislative Assembly of Delhi, led to the formation of Sheila Dikshit's government of Indian National Congress.

Results

Results by districts

Results by constituency

See also
 First Legislative Assembly of Delhi
 Second Legislative Assembly of Delhi
 Third Legislative Assembly of Delhi
 Fourth Legislative Assembly of Delhi
 Fifth Legislative Assembly of Delhi
 Sixth Legislative Assembly of Delhi

References

External links
 Legislative Assembly of Delhi, Official website
 Official Member's list, Legislative Assembly of Delhi

2008
2008 State Assembly elections in India
2000s in Delhi